Conocephalus spartinae, the saltmarsh meadow katydid, is a species of meadow katydid in the family Tettigoniidae. It is found in North America.

References

spartinae
Articles created by Qbugbot
Insects described in 1912